Indio is the stage name for Canadian singer-songwriter Gordon Peterson who released one album, Big Harvest in 1989, which includes the top 10 hit "Hard Sun."

History
Gordon Peterson grew up in Dundas; a constituent community in the City of Hamilton in Ontario, Canada.

The name Indio came to him while recording the second half of the album Big Harvest in California with Larry Klein. One afternoon, Peterson drove down to Mexico and the last town before he crossed the California/Mexico border was named Indio. At that point, Peterson decided he didn't want to use his own name on the album and decided to use Indio.

Big Harvest
Big Harvest took two months to record. It involved several high-profile artists including Hamiltonian Bill Dillon and David Rhodes (Peter Gabriel) on guitars. Larry Klein played bass. Brenda Russell, also of Hamilton, sang background vocals, as did Joni Mitchell. Other collaborators included Indian violinist L. Subramaniam. The album appeared on the RPM 100 Chart in 1989.

"Hard Sun" was released as the lead-off single from the album, with a stripped-down acoustic version of the song on the record's B-side. "Hard Sun" was a top 10 hit in Canada, peaking at No. 10 in September 1989 and the song reached the same position on the Billboard Alternative Songs chart that same month. Peterson, who was sensitive to industry demands, walked away from the business shortly after Indio's release.  He was conflicted by a love to create music and the expectations imposed upon him.

In 2007, Indio issued a new song, entitled "This Way Down", to a small number of fans and friends. The song features creative, at-home-studio techniques including a unique vocal recording accompanied by an electric guitar.

Big Harvest has become a collector's item, with used copies commanding up to $400 on eBay. On January 27, 2009 Big Harvest was reissued by Pacemaker Entertainment, a Canadian CD reissue label.

The album is, nowadays, often noted for its connotation towards conservation and spirituality through nature. The singer said that his eye for nature and conservation came from working on his grandfather's tobacco farm in Canada as a child.

"Hard Sun" lawsuit
Eddie Vedder covered the single "Hard Sun" for the 2007 Sean Penn movie Into the Wild. Peterson re-emerged into the public when he filed a lawsuit in December 2009 against Pearl Jam's Eddie Vedder, alleging infringement resulting from usage and alteration of "Hard Sun" without Peterson's permission, although Universal Music, Peterson's former label, granted permission. The suit against Vedder was dismissed, while a simultaneous suit against Universal was dropped after Universal and Peterson reached an undisclosed settlement.

Discography
1989 – Big Harvest – A&M Records

References

Canadian singer-songwriters
People from Dundas, Ontario
Year of birth missing (living people)
Canadian male singers
Musicians from Hamilton, Ontario
Living people
Musicians from Toronto
Place of birth missing (living people)
A&M Records artists
Canadian rock musicians
Canadian male singer-songwriters